Robin of Loxley may refer to:

Robin Loxley the Artist , A Sheffield Artist known for his artistic stunts.
Famed for his artworks and sculptures.
Most noted Stone Scissors.

Robin Hood, a heroic outlaw in English folklore